That Was Heidelberg on Summer Nights (German:Das war in Heidelberg in blauer Sommernacht) is a 1927 German romance film directed by Emmerich Hanus and starring Fritz Alberti, Charlotte Susa and Olga Engl. The film was shot on location in Heidelberg.

Cast
In alphabetical order
 Fritz Alberti as Sanitätsrat Liningen  
 Fritz Beckmann as Revuedirektor  
 Olga Engl as Frau v. Helling  
 Karl Etlinger as Schmierenschauspieler Ehrenfleck  
 Julius Falkenstein as Stransky  
 Tonio Gennaro as Erste Chargierte  
 Antonie Jaeckel as Frau von Gutsbesitzer Wagner  
 Margarete Kupfer as Studentenwirtin  
 Max Maximilian as Korpsdiener  
 Frida Richard as Großmutter Liningen  
 Ernst Rückert as Rudolf  
 Fritz Schroeter as Geldverleiher  
 Charlotte Susa as Grete  
 Hertha von Walther as Hertha  
 Eduard von Winterstein as Gutsbesitzer Wagner

References

Bibliography
 Grange, William. Cultural Chronicle of the Weimar Republic. Scarecrow Press, 2008.

External links 
 

1927 films
Films of the Weimar Republic
German romantic drama films
German silent feature films
1927 romantic drama films
Films directed by Emmerich Hanus
Films set in Heidelberg
German black-and-white films
Silent romantic drama films
1920s German films